The National Naval Aviation Museum, formerly known as the National Museum of Naval Aviation and the Naval Aviation Museum, is a military and aerospace museum located at Naval Air Station Pensacola, Florida.

Founded in 1962 and moved to its current location in 1974, the museum has since 2019 been closed to the public and open only to holders of U.S. Defense Department identification cards.

Overview
The museum is devoted to the history of naval aviation, including that of the United States Navy, the United States Marine Corps, and the United States Coast Guard. Its mission is "to select, collect, preserve and display" appropriate memorabilia representative of the development, growth and historic heritage of United States Naval Aviation. More than 150 aircraft and spacecraft are on display, including four former Blue Angels A-4 Skyhawks, the Curtiss NC-4 (the first aircraft to cross the Atlantic), U.S. Coast Guard helicopters, biplanes, a K-47 Airship control gondola and tail fin, an aircraft that President George H. W. Bush trained in, and the S-3 Viking used to transport President George W. Bush to the USS Abraham Lincoln in 2003 (see Navy One).  These historic and one-of-a-kind aircraft are displayed inside the museum's  of exhibit space and outside on its  grounds.

The museum also functions in coordination with the Naval Air Systems Command (NAVAIRSYSCOM or NAVAIR) as the Navy's program manager for nearly all other retired Navy, Marine Corps and Coast Guard aircraft on display aboard U.S. military installations in the United States or overseas, or in numerous other museums or public displays. In a similar manner to U.S. Air Force aircraft on loan from the NMUSAF's collection that remain under official USAF ownership, these other American-preserved naval aircraft remain the property of the Department of the Navy and are typically identified at these locations as being "On Loan from the National Naval Aviation Museum."

The museum has a Giant Screen Theater, flight simulators, Blue Angels 4D Experience, museum store, and cafe. The Cubi Point Café displays squadron memorabilia from the closed NAS Cubi Point Officers' Club.

Emil Buehler Naval Aviation Library

The museum houses the Emil Buehler Naval Aviation Library. Established in 1992 with funding from the Emil Buehler Trust, it serves as a non-circulating repository for the National Naval Aviation Museum and is considered one of the richest sources of Naval history in the United States. The library's namesake, Emil Buehler, was an aviation pioneer who funded a philanthropic trust and education programs in colleges throughout Florida and the eastern United States. The library holds artifacts and special collections of items from people and events of importance to the history of aviation in America and naval history. The collection contains books, oral histories, pictures, manuscripts, technical manuals and about 400,000 photographs, many of which are searchable and organized. The library's special collections include a sampling of the earliest tales gathered by members of the Brown Shoe Project, who have compiled stories and histories of aviation squadrons that flew missions during the Korean War. It hosts commemorations such as the 50th anniversary of the Apollo 11 moon landing in 2019.  The library holds Buzz Aldrin’s flight training records from the early days of his Naval career.

National Flight Academy

Adjacent to the museum and library is the National Flight Academy, a four-story simulated aircraft carrier housing over 30 networked flight simulators.  Throughout the summer, more than 200 students per week (7th through 12th grade) from across the nation attend the National Flight Academy's 6-day program, designed to inspire attendees to pursue a future in STEM (science, technology, engineering and mathematics).

The museum is supported by a 501(c)(3) educational non-profit organization, the Naval Aviation Museum Foundation. Since 1966, this foundation has raised tens of millions of dollars to construct the museum, build exhibits, recover and restore aircraft, and develop educational programs like the National Flight Academy.

Practice demonstrations by the United States Navy Flight Demonstration Squadron, the Blue Angels, may be viewed from the museum most Tuesday and Wednesday mornings between March and November. These practices are weather permitting, and a tentative practice schedule may be viewed on the Blue Angels' website.

Captain Robert L. Rasmussen, a retired Navy captain, former Navy fighter pilot and former Blue Angels demonstration pilot, served as museum director for 27 years and reported to the Naval History & Heritage Command.  Also an artist, some of his works are displayed in the museum. Captain Rasmussen retired as director in 2014 and was replaced by Captain Sterling Gilliam, Jr.

History
The museum was established 14 December 1962 in a cramped 8,500-square-foot building erected during World War II. It was dedicated in June 1963.

Construction of the current facility began in November 1972. The Phase I portion opened in November 1974 and was dedicated on 13 April 1975 . The Phase II portion was completed in 1980, and the Phase III portion in 1990.

The museum and some of its aircraft on display outside were damaged by Hurricane Ivan in September 2004.

In 2019, after a gunman killed three people and injured eight more at the air station, the museum and other National Park attractions were closed to the public.

In 2020, the museum was closed for seven months during the COVID-19 pandemic.

In 2021, museum officials were reported to be planning to reopen the museum to the public.

In 2022, discussions began on converting portions of existing roads to create a dedicated access corridor to the museum.

Collection

See also
Naval Aviation Hall of Honor
List of maritime museums in the United States

Naval aviation museums
Aeronauticum, German naval aviation museum, Nordholz
Fleet Air Arm Museum, United Kingdom museum of naval aviation, Yeovil, Somerset
Fleet Air Arm Museum (Australia), Australian museum of naval aviation, Nowra, New South Wales
Naval Aviation Museum (India), Indian naval aviation museum, Goa, India
Shearwater Aviation Museum, Canadian naval aviation museum, Sheerwater, Nova Scotia.
Pacific Aviation Museum, US Pacific Fleet and Japanese aviation, Pearl Harbor, Hawaii.

United States museums
Flying Leatherneck Aviation Museum
List of maritime museums in the United States
United States Marine Corps Aviation
U.S. Navy Museum
National Museum of the United States Air Force
United States Army Aviation Museum

Other
A and T Recovery
R.G. Smith Award
List of aerospace museums

References

External links

National Naval Aviation Museum official website
National Flight Academy

Aerospace museums in Florida
Maritime museums in Florida
Museums in Pensacola, Florida
Pensacola metropolitan area
United States naval aviation
Military and war museums in Florida
United States Navy museums
Marine Corps museums in the United States
Museums established in 1962
Naval History and Heritage Command
1962 establishments in Florida